The 2002–03 FIS Cross-Country World Cup was the 22nd official World Cup season in cross-country skiing for men and women. The season began in Düsseldorf, Germany, on 26 October on 2002 and was concluded in Falun, Sweden, on 23 March 2003. Mathias Fredriksson of Sweden won the overall men's cup, and Bente Skari of Norway won the women's.

Calendar

Men

Women

Men's team

Women's team

Mixed team

Men's standings

Overall

Sprint

Women's standings

Overall

Sprint

Achievements
Victories in this World Cup (all-time number of victories as of 2002/03 season in parentheses)

Men
 , 4 (5) first places
 , 2 (6) first places
 , 2 (2) first places
 , 1 (5) first place
 , 1 (4) first places
 , 1 (2) first place
 , 1 (2) first place
 , 1 (1) first place
 , 1 (1) first place
 , 1 (1) first place
 , 1 (1) first place
 , 1 (1) first place
 , 1 (1) first place
 , 1 (1) first place
 , 1 (1) first place
 , 1 (1) first place

Women
 , 14 (42) first places
 , 3 (3) first places
 , 2 (9) first places
 , 1 (4) first place
 , 1 (2) first place
 , 1 (1) first place

References

External links

FIS Cross-Country World Cup seasons
World Cup 2002-03
World Cup 2002-03